Hearts of Freedom or Hati Merdeka, is a 2011 Indonesian drama fiction historical film and was the third film in the Merah Putih trilogy. The first was Merah Putih, followed by Darah Garuda. The films describe how a group of Indonesian army cadets fight for freedom from Dutch colonialism. This film is an adaptation of the Japanese propaganda film Hati Merdeka by Andreas Liong and Ignatius Matulessy in 1944.

Context
Set during the revolution in early 1948, HEARTS OF FREEDOM follows a band of cadets who become elite guerrilla soldiers following a 1947 massacre of their cadet classmates (a story based on the real-life battle that killed both of Hashim's uncles in Lengkong in 1946).

Plot
After completing a tragic mission in which one of the band's most beloved members is killed, the band's loyalty to the cause is put to the ultimate test when their leader, Amir (Lukman Sardi) resigns from the Army in disgust. Leaderless and heartsick over their losses, the cadets carry their vendetta for revenge against the Dutch to the high seas in a dangerous mission to Bali, home island of the maimed mute Dayan (T. Rifnu Wikana), where they are sent to kill the Dutch militia Colonel Raymer (Michael Bell), who murdered the family of the band's new leader Tomas (Donny Alamsyah) in the opening of RED AND WHITE. Facing the cannons of a Dutch PT boat, the hard-drinking playboy Marius (Darius Sinathrya) must overcome his fears as he rivals Tomas for the affections of the starchy aristocrat's daughter Senja (Rahayu Saraswati).

Arriving in Bali, the band saves the woman Dayu (new cast member Ranggani Puspandya) from the ravages of Colonel Raymer's KNIL militia, but one of the heroes is nearly killed. As their friend hovers between life and death, the band finds the caves of rebel leader Wayan Suta (played by the singer Nugie). Tomas clashes with their former commander, Amir (Lukman Sardi) as they plan a final assault against Raymer's militia, raising the question: how far can the revolution go to defeat evil, and still retain its ideals?

Cast
 Lukman Sardi as Amir
 Darius Sinathrya as Marius
 Donny Alamsyah as Thomas
 Teuku Rifnu Wikana as Dayan
 Rahayu Saraswati as Senja
 Astri Nurdin as Melati
 Ranggani Puspandya as Dayu
 Nugie as Wayan Suta
 Agung Udijana as Sumarjo

External links

https://web.archive.org/web/20120103133442/http://www.hatimerdeka.com/

Indonesian drama films
2010s Indonesian-language films